Jennifer, Jenny, or Jennie Lee may refer to:

People 
 Jennie Lee (American actress) (1848–1925), American stage and silent film actress
 Jennie Lee (British actress) (1854–1930), British stage actress
 Jennie Lee, Baroness Lee of Asheridge (1904–1988), British politician and life peer
 Jennie Lee (dancer) (1928–1990), American stripper, burlesque entertainer and actress
 Jennifer Lee (equestrian) (born 1965), Hong Kong equestrian
 Jennifer Lee (filmmaker) (born 1971), Walt Disney animation screenwriter and co-director
 Jennifer Lee (scientist), Antarctic researcher and scientist
 Jenny Lee (venture capitalist) (born 1972), Singaporean venture capitalist 
 Jennifer Nicole Lee (born 1975), American model and actress
 Jennifer 8. Lee (born 1976), American journalist and author
 Jennifer Lee (sociologist)

Other uses 
 "Jennie Lee" (song) by Jan and Arnie
 Jenny Lee Bakery, a Pittsburgh-based bakery
 Tokimonsta (real name Jennifer Lee), American electronic musician and producer

See also
 Jennifer Worth (1935–2011), née Lee, British nurse and author, depicted as "Jenny Lee" in TV series Call the Midwife
 Jenny Lee-Wright (born 1947), British actress
 Jenny Lee Smith (born 1948), English golfer
 Jennifer Jason Leigh (born 1962), American actress
 Jennifer Leigh (born 1983), American poker player
 Jennifer Leigh Warren, American actress
 Jen Lee (disambiguation)

Lee, Jennifer